Dacre is a village and civil parish in the Harrogate district of North Yorkshire, England, it is 5 miles south of Pateley Bridge.  In the 2001 census the parish had a population of 658, increasing to 764 at the 2011 Census. The village is situated on the crest of a hill overlooking the River Nidd. Infrastructure of the village includes a small chapel and an old single-room schoolhouse which is currently used for community events.

The largest settlement in the parish is Dacre Banks, on the River Nidd, where the church is located.  The village of Dacre lies on higher ground a mile south of Dacre Banks.

Etymology
The name Dacre is of Brittonic origin and derived from the element *dagr, meaning "tears, weeping" and semantically "damp, moisture, wetness, trickling" (c.f. Welsh dagr). It shares its etymology with the identically named Dacre in Cumbria.

References

External links

Villages in North Yorkshire
Civil parishes in North Yorkshire
Nidderdale